Jorge Hugo Rojas Justiniano (born 6 December 1993) is a Bolivian professional footballer who plays as a midfielder for Oriente Petrolero.

International career
In September 2018 Rojas was called up to the Bolivia national football team. Rojas made his debut for Bolivia in a 2-2 friendly tie with Nicaragua on 3 March 2019.

References

External links
 
 

1993 births
Living people
Sportspeople from Santa Cruz de la Sierra
Bolivian footballers
Association football midfielders
Sport Boys Warnes players
Club Always Ready players
Bolivian Primera División players
Bolivia international footballers